Neotelphusa similella is a moth of the family Gelechiidae. It is found in Zimbabwe.

References

Moths described in 1958
Neotelphusa